John G. Myers may refer to:

 John Gillespy Myers (1831-1901), owner of John G. Myers Company, a department store in Albany, New York
 John Golding Myers (1897-1942), a British entomologist